Ectosteorhachis is a genus of prehistoric lobe-finned fish that lived during the Permian period (Cisuralian epoch, about 299 to 272 million years ago). It belonged to the group of Tetrapodomorpha and to the family of Megalichthyidae. Ectosteorhachis was a fresh water fish.

References

Prehistoric lobe-finned fish genera
Permian bony fish
Permian fish of North America
Megalichthyiforms